Coventry is a town in Kent County, Rhode Island,  United States.

Geography

The town is bordered by West Warwick to the east, Foster, Scituate, and Cranston to the north, West Greenwich and East Greenwich to the south, and Sterling, Connecticut, to the west.

Climate

According to the Köppen Climate Classification system, Coventry has an oceanic climate, abbreviated "Cfb" on climate maps.

History 

Coventry was first settled by English colonists in the early 18th century, when the town was part of Warwick. Since the area was so far away from the center of Warwick, the section that became Coventry grew very slowly. However, by 1741, enough farmers (about 100 families) had settled in the area that they petitioned the General Assembly of Rhode Island to create their own town. The petition was granted, and the new town was named "Coventry", after the English city. For the rest of the 18th century, Coventry remained a rural town populated by farmers. Among the buildings that survive are the Waterman Tavern (1740s), the Nathanael Greene Homestead (1770), and the Paine Homestead (late 17th century/early 18th century). The oldest church, Maple Root Baptist Church, dates from the end of the 18th century. The congregation was organized in 1762 and was affiliated with the General Six-Principle Baptists.

During the Revolutionary War, the people of Coventry were supporters of the patriot cause. Nathanael Greene, a resident of Coventry, rose through the ranks to become a leading general of the American army. By the end of the war, Greene was second in command in the US army after George Washington.

In the 19th century, the Industrial Revolution came to Coventry with the building of the first mill in Anthony. Over the next century, the eastern end of town became very industrialized, with manufacturing centers being located in Anthony, Washington, Quidnick, and Harris villages. Many of the old factories still stand in the town, and the village centers (in particular, Anthony and Quidnick) remain mostly intact. The demographics of the town changed, as industrial jobs at these new mill villages attracted French Canadian and Irish immigrants. By the end of the 19th century, almost one fourth of the population was born outside the US, and French was the primary language for many of the people in the eastern part of Coventry. Not all immigrants worked in the factories. Census records from the late 19th century show that some owned farms.

By comparison, the western end of the town remained very rural, with the only centers of population being located at Greene and Summit, both established as railroad stations on the New York, New Haven and Hartford Railroad.

In the 20th century, the town went through much change. The advent of the automobile brought an end of the railroad. (The track was dismantled in the 1970s, and in the early 21st century, the right of way was revitalized as the Washington Secondary Rail Trail/Greenway). By the mid-20th century, industry had largely left the town and most of the factories closed.

Since the late 20th century, the town has attracted new residents, and the eastern part of the town became suburbanized. In the early 21st century, a movement in the town has developed to limit residential development to keep the rural flavor of the western part of the town.

Recreation 

Coventry offers a few recreation facilities. The town has youth sport leagues for football (boasting the 2006 American Youth Football National title), basketball, baseball, and softball. Carbuncle Pond off Route 14 (Plainfield Pike) near the Connecticut border is a  pond that is popular for freshwater fishing. Johnson's Pond, a waterfront neighborhood, houses facilities for fishing and watersports. Wakeboarding Magazine rated Johnson's Pond as the best location for wakeboarding in Rhode Island. The  George B. Parker woodland, owned by the Audubon Society of Rhode Island, offers several hiking trails. The woodland caretaker's home dates from the mid 18th century. 

The town has been investing in the Coventry Greenway, a pedestrian and bicycle path built on the old New York, New Haven and Hartford Railroad right-of-way and part of the East Coast Greenway, a trail running from Maine to Florida. The Coventry Greenway travels  from the Connecticut state line to the West Warwick town line. The greenway has recently undergone a massive renovation and has reopened to the public as a walking, cycling, and horse trail.

Villages

Coventry has numerous villages founded in the 19th century; they are:

 Anthony – Mill village in the eastern part of the town
 Arkwright – Mill village founded by James DeWolf, a slave trader
 Blackrock – Named after a large dark rock rumored to be the site of Native American marriage ceremonies
 Colvintown – Named after original settlers, the Colvin's
 Coventry Centre – Village in the geographic center of Coventry
 Fairbanks – Mill village along the Moosup River
 Greene – Old railroad village in the western end of town
 Harris – Mill village in the northeastern part of town
 Hopkins Hollow – Rural hamlet in the southwestern part of town, almost unchanged in over 150 years
 Quidnick – Mill village on the border of West Warwick
 Rice City – Rural village in the northwestern part of town, dominated by Rice Tavern (1804), which used to serve travelers on their way to Connecticut
 Spring Lake – Former mill village
 Summit – Railroad village near Greene
 Tiogue – Formerly Barclay, after Robert Barclay
 Washington – Mill village in the center of the town
 Whaley's Hollow – Mill village and location of Waterman Tavern

Historic homes 

Coventry boasts many old homes, churches and cemeteries. Farmhouses from the 18th century can be found scattered around the town, and many are still private residences. On the eastern side of town, many homes from the 19th century can be found, ranging from the two-family mill workers residence to mansions owned by the town elites. The village of Greene and the Rice City and Hopkins Hollow parts of town have remained unchanged since the 19th century. Also, many of the churches in Coventry date from the 19th century and are still functioning churches.

National Register of Historic Places listings in Coventry

 Isaac Bowen House (1795)
 Joseph Briggs House-Coventry Town Farm (1790)
 Carbuncle Hill Archaeological District, RI-1072-1079
 General Nathanael Greene Homestead (1770)
 Hopkins Hollow Village
 Interlaken Mill Bridge (1885)
 Moosup River Site (RI-1153)
 Paine House (1748)
 Pawtuxet Valley Dyeing Company (1859)
 Read School (1831)
 Rice City Historic District
 South Main Street Historic District (Coventry, Rhode Island)
 Waterman Tavern (1744) – Historical Marker for Waterman Tavern – HMdb
 William Waterman House
 Wilson-Winslow House (1812)

Demographics

As of the census of 2000, there were 33,668 people, 12,596 households, and 9,295 families residing in the town. The racial makeup of the town was 97.60% White, 0.39% African American, 0.15% Native American, 0.56% Asian, 0.03% Pacific Islander, 0.31% from other races, and 0.97% from two or more races. Hispanic or Latino of any race were 1.14% of the population.

There were 12,596 households, out of which 34.7% had children under the age of 18 living with them, 60.4% were married couples living together, 10.0% had a female householder with no husband present, and 26.2% were non-families. 21.2% of all households were made up of individuals, and 9.1% had someone living alone who was 65 years of age or older.  The average household size was 2.63 and the average family size was 3.07.

In the town, the population was spread out, with 24.9% under the age of 18, 6.5% from 18 to 24, 31.5% from 25 to 44, 24.0% from 45 to 64, and 13.0% who were 65 years of age or older.  The median age was 38 years. For every 100 females, there were 93.9 males.  For every 100 females age 18 and over, there were 90.6 males.

The median income for a household in the town was $51,987, and the median income for a family was $60,315. Males had a median income of $40,174 versus $29,357 for females. The per capita income for the town was $22,091.  About 3.6% of families and 5.2% of the population were below the poverty line, including 5.6% of those under age 18 and 7.0% of those age 65 or over.

Government

Pursuant to its charter, Coventry's municipal government is classified as Council-Manager, with all powers vested in an elected Town Council, including the appointment of a Town Manager. Each Town councilperson represents one of five municipal districts. Members of the School Committee are also elected using these districts.

In the Rhode Island Senate, Coventry is a part of the 21st and 33rd Districts. In the Rhode Island House of Representatives it is part of the a part of the 25th, 26th, 27th, 28th, 29th and 40th Districts. At the federal level, Coventry is included in Rhode Island's 2nd congressional district and is currently represented by Democrat James R. Langevin.

Notable people 

 Henry B. Anthony (1815–1884), US senator and the 21st governor of Rhode Island; anti-Catholic newspaperman; born in Coventry
 Henry P. Baldwin (1814–1892), US senator from and the 15th governor of Michigan; born in Coventry
 Allen Bestwick (born 1961), Race Announcer with NBC and ESPN/ABC. Notable for his NASCAR work
 Peter Frechette, actor
 Nathanael Greene (1742–1786), Continental Army general during the Revolutionary War
 Mike Stefanik, driver with NASCAR
 Desiree Washington, contestant of Miss Black America whom Heavyweight boxer Mike Tyson was found guilty of raping

International relations

Twin towns – Sister cities

Coventry, Rhode Island is twinned with:
 Coventry, United Kingdom

References

External links

Official website

 
Towns in Kent County, Rhode Island
Providence metropolitan area
Towns in Rhode Island
1741 establishments in Rhode Island